John Trowbridge is the name of:

John Trowbridge (physicist) (1843–1923), American physicist
John Townsend Trowbridge (1827–1916), nineteenth century American author
John Todd Trowbridge (1780–1858), nineteenth century American sea captain, businessman, pioneer, and legislator